The following species in the grass genus Paspalum are accepted by Plants of the World Online. Species are somewhat difficult to delineate by traditional morphological methods.

List

Paspalum aberrans 
Paspalum achlysophilum 
Paspalum acuminatum 
Paspalum acutifolium 
Paspalum acutum 
Paspalum adoperiens 
Paspalum affine 
Paspalum albidulum 
Paspalum alcalinum 
Paspalum almum 
Paspalum alterniflorum 
Paspalum altsonii 
Paspalum ammodes 
Paspalum amphicarpum 
Paspalum anderssonii 
Paspalum apiculatum 
Paspalum approximatum 
Paspalum arenarium 
Paspalum arsenei 
Paspalum arundinaceum 
Paspalum arundinellum 
Paspalum aspidiotes 
Paspalum atabapense 
Paspalum atratum 
Paspalum auricomum 
Paspalum axillare 
Paspalum azuayense 
Paspalum bakeri 
Paspalum barbinode 
Paspalum barclayi 
Paspalum batianoffii 
Paspalum bertonii 
Paspalum biaristatum 
Paspalum bifidifolium 
Paspalum bifidum 
Paspalum blodgettii 
Paspalum bonairense 
Paspalum bonplandianum 
Paspalum botterii 
Paspalum brachytrichum 
Paspalum breve 
Paspalum buchtienii 
Paspalum burchellii 
Paspalum burmanii 
Paspalum cachimboense 
Paspalum caespitosum 
Paspalum campinarum 
Paspalum campylostachyum 
Paspalum canarae 
Paspalum candidum 
Paspalum cangarum 
Paspalum capillifolium 
Paspalum carajasense 
Paspalum carinatum 
Paspalum centrale 
Paspalum ceresia 
Paspalum cerradoense 
Paspalum chacoense 
Paspalum chaffanjonii 
Paspalum chaseanum 
Paspalum chiapense 
Paspalum chilense 
Paspalum cinerascens 
Paspalum clandestinum 
Paspalum clavuliferum 
Paspalum clipeum 
Paspalum comasii 
Paspalum commune 
Paspalum compressifolium 
Paspalum conduplicatum 
Paspalum conjugatum 
Paspalum conspersum 
Paspalum convexum 
Paspalum corcovadense 
Paspalum cordaense 
Paspalum cordatum 
Paspalum coryphaeum 
Paspalum costaricense 
Paspalum costellatum 
Paspalum crassum 
Paspalum crinitum 
Paspalum crispatum 
Paspalum crispulum 
Paspalum cromyorhizon 
Paspalum crucense 
Paspalum crustarium 
Paspalum culiacanum 
Paspalum cultratum 
Paspalum curassavicum 
Paspalum cymbiforme 
Paspalum dasypleurum 
Paspalum dasytrichum 
Paspalum decumbens 
Paspalum dedeccae 
Paspalum delavayi 
Paspalum delicatum 
Paspalum densum 
Paspalum denticulatum 
Paspalum dilatatum 
Paspalum dispar 
Paspalum dissectum 
Paspalum distachyon 
Paspalum distichum 
Paspalum distortum 
Paspalum divergens 
Paspalum durifolium 
Paspalum edmondii 
Paspalum eglume 
Paspalum ekmanianum 
Paspalum ellipticum 
Paspalum equitans 
Paspalum erectum 
Paspalum erianthoides 
Paspalum erianthum 
Paspalum eucomum 
Paspalum exaltatum 
Paspalum expansum 
Paspalum falcatum 
Paspalum fasciculatum 
Paspalum filgueirasii 
Paspalum filifolium 
Paspalum filiforme 
Paspalum fimbriatum 
Paspalum flaccidum 
Paspalum flavum 
Paspalum floridanum 
Paspalum foliiforme 
Paspalum forsterianum 
Paspalum galapageium 
Paspalum gardnerianum 
Paspalum geminiflorum 
Paspalum giuliettiae 
Paspalum glabrinode 
Paspalum glaucescens 
Paspalum glaziovii 
Paspalum glumaceum 
Paspalum goyanum 
Paspalum goyasense 
Paspalum gracielae 
Paspalum graniticum 
Paspalum guaricense 
Paspalum guayanerum 
Paspalum guenoarum 
Paspalum guttatum 
Paspalum haenkeanum 
Paspalum hallasanense 
Paspalum hartwegianum 
Paspalum hatschbachii 
Paspalum haumanii 
Paspalum heterotrichon 
Paspalum hintonii 
Paspalum hirsutum 
Paspalum hirtum 
Paspalum hispidum 
Paspalum hitchcockii 
Paspalum huberi 
Paspalum humboldtianum 
Paspalum hyalinum 
Paspalum imbricatum 
Paspalum inaequivalve 
Paspalum inconstans 
Paspalum indecorum 
Paspalum insulare 
Paspalum intermedium 
Paspalum ionanthum 
Paspalum itaboense 
Paspalum jaliscanum 
Paspalum jesuiticum 
Paspalum jimenezii 
Paspalum juergensii 
Paspalum killipii 
Paspalum lachneum 
Paspalum lacustre 
Paspalum laeve 
Paspalum lamprocaryon 
Paspalum lanciflorum 
Paspalum langei 
Paspalum latipes 
Paspalum laurentii 
Paspalum laxum 
Paspalum lentiginosum 
Paspalum leptachne 
Paspalum lepton 
Paspalum ligulare 
Paspalum lilloi 
Paspalum limbatum 
Paspalum lindenianum 
Paspalum lineare 
Paspalum loefgrenii 
Paspalum longiaristatum 
Paspalum longicuspe 
Paspalum longipedicellatum 
Paspalum longum 
Paspalum luxurians 
Paspalum macranthecium 
Paspalum macrophyllum 
Paspalum maculosum 
Paspalum madorense 
Paspalum malacophyllum 
Paspalum malmeanum 
Paspalum mandiocanum 
Paspalum maritimum 
Paspalum marmoratum 
Paspalum mayanum 
Paspalum melanospermum 
Paspalum microstachyum 
Paspalum millegranum 
Paspalum minarum 
Paspalum minus 
Paspalum minutispiculatum 
Paspalum modestum 
Paspalum molle 
Paspalum monostachyum 
Paspalum morichalense 
Paspalum mosquitiense 
Paspalum motembense 
Paspalum multicaule 
Paspalum multinodum 
Paspalum mutabile 
Paspalum nanum 
Paspalum nelsonii 
Paspalum nesiotes 
Paspalum niquelandiae 
Paspalum notatum 
Paspalum nudatum 
Paspalum nummularium 
Paspalum nutans 
Paspalum oligostachyum 
Paspalum orbiculare 
Paspalum orbiculatum 
Paspalum oreophilum 
Paspalum oteroi 
Paspalum ovale 
Paspalum pallens 
Paspalum pallidum 
Paspalum palmeri 
Paspalum palustre 
Paspalum paniculatum 
Paspalum parviflorum 
Paspalum parvulum 
Paspalum pauciciliatum 
Paspalum paucifolium 
Paspalum peckii 
Paspalum pectinatum 
Paspalum penicillatum 
Paspalum petilum 
Paspalum petrense 
Paspalum petrosum 
Paspalum phaeotrichum 
Paspalum phyllorhachis 
Paspalum pictum 
Paspalum pilgerianum 
Paspalum pilosum 
Paspalum pisinnum 
Paspalum planum 
Paspalum plenum 
Paspalum plicatulum 
Paspalum plowmanii 
Paspalum polyphyllum 
Paspalum praecox 
Paspalum procerum 
Paspalum procurrens 
Paspalum prostratum 
Paspalum pubiflorum 
Paspalum pulchellum 
Paspalum pumilum 
Paspalum pygmaeum 
Paspalum quadrifarium 
Paspalum quarinii 
Paspalum racemosum 
Paspalum ramboi 
Paspalum rawitscheri 
Paspalum reclinatum 
Paspalum rectum 
Paspalum redondense 
Paspalum reduncum 
Paspalum redundans 
Paspalum regnellii 
Paspalum remotum 
Paspalum repandum 
Paspalum repens 
Paspalum reptatum 
Paspalum restingense 
Paspalum reticulinerve 
Paspalum riedelii 
Paspalum riparium 
Paspalum robustum 
Paspalum rocanum 
Paspalum rostratum 
Paspalum rottboellioides 
Paspalum rufum 
Paspalum rugulosum 
Paspalum rupestre 
Paspalum rupium 
Paspalum saccharoides 
Paspalum saugetii 
Paspalum saurae 
Paspalum scalare 
Paspalum scandens 
Paspalum schesslii 
Paspalum schultesii 
Paspalum schumannii 
Paspalum scrobiculatum 
Paspalum scutatum 
Paspalum seminudum 
Paspalum serpentinum 
Paspalum setaceum 
Paspalum setosum 
Paspalum simplex 
Paspalum sodiroanum 
Paspalum soukupii 
Paspalum sparsum 
Paspalum squamulatum 
Paspalum stagnophilum 
Paspalum standleyi 
Paspalum stellatum 
Paspalum strigosum 
Paspalum subciliatum 
Paspalum subfalcatum 
Paspalum subsesquiglume 
Paspalum sumatrense 
Paspalum telmatum 
Paspalum tenellum 
Paspalum thrasyoides 
Paspalum thunbergii 
Paspalum tillettii 
Paspalum tinctum 
Paspalum tolucense 
Paspalum trachycoleon 
Paspalum trianae 
Paspalum trichophyllum 
Paspalum trichotomum 
Paspalum trinii 
Paspalum trinitense 
Paspalum tuberosum 
Paspalum turriforme 
Paspalum umbrosum 
Paspalum unispicatum 
Paspalum urbanianum 
Paspalum urvillei 
Paspalum usterii 
Paspalum uyucense 
Paspalum vaginatum 
Paspalum variabile 
Paspalum veredense 
Paspalum vexillarium 
Paspalum virgatum 
Paspalum virletii 
Paspalum volcanense 
Paspalum wrightii 
Paspalum yecorae 
Paspalum zuloagae

References

Paspalum